Porto Leixões Cruise Terminal  is a purpose built terminal for ocean-going passenger ships built by the Port Authority of Douro, Porto, Portugal. The terminal was opened on the 23 July 2015.

Description 
The terminal is located in the Matosinhos municipality close to the city of Porto in the northern region of Portugal. The total cost of the project is expected to be in the region of 50 million euros. The project is expected to expand and to stimulate the local tourist economy of the area. The new terminal building sits upon a 340 meter long quay and includes a pedestrian access path for use of passengers and the general public. The architect for the project was Luís Pedro Silva with the Structural design for the project being carried out by Newton Engineering Consultants. The main contractor was Ferreira Build Power of Porto.

https://youtube.com/@nojir== References ==

Matosinhos
Passenger ship terminals
Transport infrastructure in Porto